Eaton and Alsop is a civil parish within the Derbyshire Dales district, in the county of Derbyshire, England. Largely rural, Along with the adjacent Newton Grange parish, in 2011 Eaton and Alsop had a population of 155. Eaton and Alsop is wholly within the Peak District national park, and touches the parishes of Alstonefield, Hartington Nether Quarter, Newton Grange and Parwich. There are five listed buildings in Eaton and Alsop.

Toponymy 
Alsop: It was reported in Domesday as Elleshope. The full modern name of this place is Alsop en le Dale, meaning 'Ælli's/Ella's valley', the 'en la Dale' suffix being a later addition. The initial element is from the name of the Anglo Saxon King Ella, and the later syllable is from the Celtic 'hwpp' meaning 'a sloping place between hills' - the sloping place of Ella between the hills.

Eaton: Short for Coldeaton or Cold Eaton, it was known as Eitune as reported in Domesday in 1086 which means 'island farm'. It is above the steeply-rising bank of the River Dove, situated on a spur and overlooking a small island in the river. It is prefixed 'Cold' due to its exposed location.

Eaton and Alsop, as an ecclesiastical and subsequent political entity, were first constituted as a township and chapelry within the parish of Ashbourne and subsequently separated out as an independent civil parish, before 1883.

Geography

Location 
Eaton and Alsop is surrounded by the following local areas:

 Biggin to the north
 Newton Grange to the south
 Parwich to the east
 Alstonefield to the west.

The parish is roughly bounded by the River Dove to the west. The Liffs round barrow feature is to the north, Alsop Moor and Cross Low tumulus in the east, with Alsop village and The Pinch lane to the south.

Eaton and Alsop is completely within the Peak District National Park.

Settlements 

There are only two places within the parish:

 Alsop en le Dale, close to the south east boundary

These are on opposing sides of the A515 Ashbourne to Buxton road. The only village of size is Alsop en le Dale, which is wholly situated along Dam Lane. Eaton is accessed via a single track road off Liffs Road. Despite being part of the parish name, Eaton is a hamlet considered to be a deserted medieval village, with only two farms in the locality.

Environment

Landscape and geology 
Primarily farm and pasture land throughout the parish outside the populated areas, there are some small forestry plots throughout, with a stretch alongside the Dove Valley called Fishpond Bank and further north, Iron Tors and Biggin Dale. The soil is light, while the subsoil is mainly limestone.

Watercourse 
The River Dove forms the boundary to the west, with features including weirs, footbridges and stepping stones.

Land elevation 
The parish can be hilly and undulating in places.

History

Alsop

Eaton 
Eaton and Alsop was originally separate townships and manors in times past, with the first ever Derbyshire map by Christopher Saxton in 1579 indicating both as discrete settlements, but these were later merged as a township within the ancient parish of Ashbourne, latterly becoming a standalone parish before 1883, with many others being created in 1866 and councils being formed in 1894.

It is thought the field between the only remaining two farms at Eaton may have been occupied in medieval times, with more recent aerial photography lending weight to this with evidence of possible crofts. Eaton was regularly appearing in the records known as King's Remembrancer, which was an account and other records relating to lay and clerical taxation in England and Wales, until the 17th century.

Railway and station 

The Ashbourne line formerly ran through the parish from Ashbourne to Buxton. It was built in 1899 and after network cuts, closed in 1963/4. There was a railway station by the A515 and Oxclose Lane road junction, it is now a car park for the Tissington Trail, which reuses the trackbed.

Industry 
As well as the regularised agricultural roles because of its rural location, primarily for pasture farming, the area has also supported limestone mining and lime burning for many centuries which have provided stone for building and road making, with several pits and kilns previously recorded in the vicinity.

Governance and demography

Population 
There are 155 residents recorded within Eaton and Alsop (and Newton Grange) for the 2011 census, increasing from 145 in 2001.

Council administration 
The two settlements Eaton and Alsop and surrounding rural areas form a parish.

However, a parish council is formed with neighbouring Newton Grange parish, and is managed at the first level of public administration by Eaton and Alsop and Newton Grange Parish Council.

At district level, the wider area is overseen by Derbyshire Dales district council. Derbyshire County Council provides the highest level strategic services locally.

Community and leisure 
There is one public house, the Prancing Pony.

Tourism 

There are a number of holiday lodges and campsites throughout catering particularly to Peak District visitors. The medium distance Peak District walking route Tissington Trail and route 68 of the National Cycle Network follows the now unused Ashbourne railway line, which routes from north to south within the parish. There is a car park for trail users at the former train station. There is another trail alongside the River Dove within the parish that is partway between the scenic areas of Dovedale and Wolfscote Dale via Fishpond Bank, Iron Tors and Biggin Dale.

Landmarks

Listed buildings 

There are five listed structures within the parish, all at Grade II designation. These are:

 Church of St Michael
 Alsop Hall
 Two farmhouses
 A milepost along the A515 road

All except the milepost are in Alsop village. There are presently no listed features at Eaton.

Local monuments 

A number of tumulus is spread across the wider region. Eaton and Alsop parish has several of some note:

 Nettly Knowe, in the middle of the parish
 Lifts Low straddles the northern boundary
 Hawks Low is primarily in the adjacent Parwich parish, but the highest point of the hill is in Eaton and Alsop
 Cross Low, to the south east
Stoney Lew, by Eaton.

Religious sites

Church of St Michael and All Angels 

A standout feature of Alsop village, the church of St Michaels and All Angels dates to the 12th century but was largely rebuilt in the 19th century.

Notable people 

 Anthony Alsop (c.1618-1691), Lord of the manor of Alsop-en-le-Dale
 Henry Allsopp, 1st Baron Hindlip (1811–1887), later Lord of the manor and industrialist

References

External links 

 Eaton and Alsop (and Newton Grange) Parish Council

Civil parishes in Derbyshire
Derbyshire Dales